The 2017–18 Swiss Basketball League (SBL) season was the 87th season of the top tier basketball league in Switzerland.

Competition format
All teams will play two times against each other for completing 22 games per team.

The six first qualified teams will join the group for places 1 to 6 while the other six teams will play the group for places 7 to 12. These two groups will be played with a one-legged round-robin format, where all teams from group 1 to 6 and the two first qualified teams from the group for the seventh position will be qualified for the playoffs. In this intermediate stage, teams start with the points accumulated by the winnings achieved in the first stage.

The quarterfinals and the semifinals will be played as a best-of-five series while the final in a best-of-seven series.

Teams 

BBC Lausanne did not continue playing in the SBL and was replaced by Pully and Vevey Riviera.

Regular season

Second stage

Group 1–6

Group 7–12

Play-offs
Seeded teams played at home games 1, 2, 5 and, in the finals, 7.

Source:

References

External links 
 

Championnat LNA seasons
Swiss
basketball
basketball